Hugh Charles Padgham (born 15 February 1955) is an English record producer and audio engineer. He has won four Grammy Awards, for Producer of the Year and Album of the Year for 1985, Record of the Year for 1990, and Engineer of the Year for 1993. A 1992 poll in Mix magazine voted him one of the world's "Top Ten Most Influential Producers". Padgham's co-productions include hits by Phil Collins, XTC, Genesis, the Human League, Sting, and the Police. He pioneered (with Peter Gabriel and producer Steve Lillywhite) the "gated reverb" drum sound used most famously in Collins' song "In the Air Tonight".

Early life
Padgham was born on 15 February 1955 in Amersham, Buckinghamshire. He was educated at St Edward's School, Oxford.

Career
Padgham became interested in record production after listening to Elton John's Tumbleweed Connection. He started out as a tape operator at Advision Studios, working on many recording sessions including Mott The Hoople and Gentle Giant. From there he went to Lansdowne Studios and moved from tape-operator/assistant engineer to engineer. In 1978, Padgham got a job at The Townhouse, where he engineered and/or produced acts including XTC, Peter Gabriel and Phil Collins. He also worked on the second album by Killing Joke.

Padgham's previous work with Gabriel and Collins led to a collaboration with Genesis and Phil Collins in the 1980s, which produced the albums: Face Value, Abacab, Hello, I Must Be Going!, Genesis, No Jacket Required, Invisible Touch and ...But Seriously. In addition to his work with Genesis and XTC, Padgham co-produced two albums with the Police: Ghost in the Machine and Synchronicity, as well as some of Police frontman Sting's solo work. He also worked on Paul McCartney's Press to Play and The Human League's Hysteria.

In the 2000s, Padgham worked with Sting as well as McFly. He had four UK number one hits in 2005 and 2006 with McFly, as well as a number of other Top Ten Singles. In 2002, Padgham produced the Tragically Hip album In Violet Light.

In 2019, Hugh Padgham was honoured in London with The MPG Award For Outstanding Contribution To UK Music. The surprise presenters for the evening for Hugh were his friend, Peter Gabriel, and the CEO of PPL, Peter Leathem. The 11th MPG Awards featured a total of 16 award categories, each designed to recognise and celebrate the best and brightest talent in music production, along with the industry's rising stars.

Hugh is one of the owners of the indie label Gearbox Records.

The "gated drum" sound 
Padgham is credited with creating the "gated reverb" drum sound used so prominently on Phil Collins' single "In the Air Tonight", and which became the template for much of the recorded pop drum sound of the 1980s. The effect is believed to have first been used on the 1980 third self-titled solo album by Peter Gabriel, which Padgham engineered and on which Collins played. At this time, Padgham was working regularly as the recording engineer for noted UK producer Steve Lillywhite, and they collaborated on many well-known albums and singles in the early 1980s.

Padgham's gated drum effect is created by adding a large amount of heavily compressed room ambience to the original drum sound, and then feeding that reverb signal through an electronic device known as a noise gate. This unit can be programmed to cut off any signal fed through it, either after a specified time interval (in this case, some tens of milliseconds), or when the incoming signal falls below a preset gain threshold. The result is the arresting 'gated reverb' effect, in which the reverberation cuts off abruptly, rather than fading away.

In a 2006 interview, Padgham revealed how the effect was first engineered:
The whole thing came through the famous "listen mic" on the SSL console. The SSL had put this massive compressor on it because the whole idea was to hang one mic in the middle of the studio and hear somebody talking on the other side. And it just so happened that we turned it on one day when Phil [Collins] was playing his drums. And then I had the idea of feeding that back into the console and putting the noise gate on, so when he stopped playing it sucked the big sound of the room into nothing.

Collaborators 
Artists for whom Padgham has produced or engineered include:
311
Bee Gees
David Bowie (Tonight) (1984)
Kate Bush
Toni Childs
Clannad
Paula Cole
Phil Collins (Face Value, Hello, I Must Be Going!, No Jacket Required, ...But Seriously, Dance into the Light)
Julian Cope
Sheryl Crow
The Dream Academy 
Melissa Etheridge
Mick Farren
Julia Fordham
The Fixx
Peter Gabriel (engineer, Peter Gabriel (1980 album))
Genesis (Abacab, Genesis, Invisible Touch)
Hall & Oates
Nicky Holland
The Human League
I Was a Cub Scout
Elton John
The Lightyears
Anni-Frid Lyngstad (engineer)
Madness (mixing, 1988)
Mansun
Paul McCartney
McFly
Mike + The Mechanics
Northern Pikes (Snow in June, 1990)
Youssou N'Dour
The Police (Ghost in the Machine, Synchronicity)
The Psychedelic Furs
Kim Richey (1999 album Glimmer)
L. Shankar
Spandau Ballet
Split Enz (Time and Tide, Conflicting Emotions)
Sting
Sweet
Tears for Fears
The Tragically Hip (In Violet Light, 2002)
Van der Graaf Generator (mixing, 2010)
Suzanne Vega
The Waitresses
Brian Wilson
XTC (engineer, 1979, 1980, 1982)
Yes (Drama)
Frank Zappa
Derek & Clive!

Awards

Grammy Awards

Brit Awards

BASCA

References

Further reading

External links
 Interview with Hugh Padgham
 Hugh Padgham – Artist – grammy.com
 Video interview with Hugh Padgham
 Brit Awards

1955 births
Living people
People from Amersham
English record producers
English audio engineers
Grammy Award winners
People educated at St Edward's School, Oxford